Sis Rural District is in the Central District of Shabestar County, East Azerbaijan province, Iran. At the National Census of 2006, its population was 9,829 in 2,521 households. There were 10,899 inhabitants in 3,127 households at the following census of 2011. At the most recent census of 2016, the population of the rural district was 9,734 in 3,139 households. The largest of its 10 villages was Ali Shah, with 3,010 people.

References 

Shabestar County

Rural Districts of East Azerbaijan Province

Populated places in East Azerbaijan Province

Populated places in Shabestar County